Igor Costrov (born 3 August 1987) is a Moldovan footballer who plays for Slavia Mozyr.

Club career
Costrov began his professional career with FC Dinamo Bender in Moldova before signing with Liga Leumit club Hapoel Be'er Sheva. He signed with Major League Soccer club Kansas City Wizards in February 2010. However, Kostrov was released by the club without making a league appearance. He joined Belarusian club Slavia Mozyr in January 2016.

International career
He made his debut for Moldova national football team on 3 June 2021 in a friendly against Turkey. He substituted Alexandru Antoniuc in the 67th minute.

References

External links

1987 births
Living people
Moldovan footballers
Association football midfielders
Moldova under-21 international footballers
Moldova international footballers
Moldovan expatriate footballers
Israeli Premier League players
Liga Leumit players
Hapoel Be'er Sheva F.C. players
Maccabi Herzliya F.C. players
Sporting Kansas City players
FC Dacia Chișinău players
FC Iskra-Stal players
FC Tiraspol players
FC Slavia Mozyr players
FC Costuleni players
FC Veris Chișinău players
FC Kyzylzhar players
FC Gomel players
Expatriate footballers in Israel
Expatriate footballers in Belarus
Expatriate footballers in Kazakhstan
Expatriate soccer players in the United States
Moldovan expatriate sportspeople in Israel
Moldovan expatriate sportspeople in Belarus
Moldovan expatriate sportspeople in Kazakhstan